Aquila Emil (died 4 February 2011) was a Papua New Guinean rugby league player who represented Papua New Guinea .

Playing career
Emil played for Port Moresby's Brothers rugby league club during the 1980s. He was selected for the Papua New Guinea Kumuls and represented the side in two World Cup matches in 1992. He captained Papua New Guinea at the 1994 World Sevens.

Emil joined the North Queensland Cowboys on a two-year contract in 1994 but, after playing in 1995 pre-season trials, asked for a release. Emil was in the original Port Moresby Vipers squad to play in the Inter-City competition.

Following the end of his playing career, Emil worked at the schools rugby league level. Later, Emil became involved in the PNG NRL Bid's schools rollout program.

Death
Emil died in a shooting in Port Moresby in the early morning of 4 February 2011. Theo Yasause, a 44-year-old former chief of staff to Papua New Guinea prime minister Michael Somare, was charged with Emil's murder.

References

2011 deaths
Deaths by firearm in Papua New Guinea
Expatriate rugby league players in Australia
Papua New Guinea national rugby league team players
Papua New Guinean expatriate rugby league players
Papua New Guinean expatriate sportspeople in Australia
Papua New Guinean murder victims
Papua New Guinean rugby league players
People murdered in Papua New Guinea
Port Moresby Vipers players
Rugby league five-eighths
Rugby league halfbacks
Year of birth missing